"Henry V" is fourth episode of the first series of the British television series The Hollow Crown, based on the play of the same name by William Shakespeare. The episode was produced by Rupert Ryle-Hodges, directed by Thea Sharrock and starred Tom Hiddleston as Henry V of England. It was first broadcast on 21 July 2012 on BBC Two.

Henry V is the fourth play in Shakespeare's tetralogy dealing with the successive reigns of Richard II, Henry IV, and Henry V.

Plot changes
The episode starts with the funeral of Henry V (which is the start of Henry VI, part 1) over whose obsequies the opening speech from the Chorus is made. After that, the movie begins to speak about Henry V.

Certain scenes from Shakespeare's play are omitted:
 The Southampton Plot and Henry's merciless response.
 The scenes among the ordinary men at the Siege of Harfleur, featuring Fluellen, MacMorris and Jamy.
 The conversations in the French camp on the evening before the battle.
 The slaughter of the young boys guarding the English baggage train at Agincourt.

Cast

 Tom Hiddleston as King Henry V
 Julie Walters as Mistress Nell Quickly
 John Hurt as the Chorus
 Geraldine Chaplin as Alice
 Paul Freeman as Sir Thomas Erpingham
 Tom Georgeson as Bardolph
 Richard Griffiths as Duke of Burgundy
 Paterson Joseph as Edward, Duke of York
 James Laurenson as Earl of Westmorland
 Anton Lesser as Duke of Exeter
 Paul Ritter as Ancient Pistol
 Malcolm Sinclair as Archbishop of Canterbury
 Owen Teale as Captain Fluellen
 Mélanie Thierry as Princess Katherine
 Lambert Wilson as King Charles VI of France
 Edward Akrout as Louis, the Dauphin
 Tom Brooke as Corporal Nym
 Jeremie Covillaut as Montjoy
 Maxime Lefrançois as The Constable of France
 Stanley Weber as Duke of Orleans
 John Dagleish as John Bates
 Gwilym Lee as Williams
 Richard Clothier as Earl of Salisbury
 Nigel Cooke as Bishop of Ely
 George Sargeant as Falstaff's boy
 Simon Russell Beale as Sir John Falstaff (cameo)

Filming Locations
Baron's Hall in Penshurst Place was used as the setting for the French Palace and Squerryes Court doubled as the French battle court field.

References

External links
 
 

2012 British television episodes
Hundred Years' War in fiction
The Hollow Crown (TV series)
Works based on Henry V (play)